Antonello Bacciocchi (2 November 1957 – 2007) was a Sammarinese politician. He was one of the captains-regent of San Marino until his term with Claudio Muccioli expired on 1 April 2006. As is traditional in San Marino, the term started on 1 October 2005; he had previously served as a captain-regent from 1 April 1999, to 1 October 1999. Bacciocchi is a member of the San Marinese Socialist Party and Minister of Labour, Cooperation and Youth Policies.

References 

 Azerbaijan-San Marinese relations: captains-regent

Captains Regent of San Marino
Members of the Grand and General Council
1957 births
2007 deaths
People from the City of San Marino
Sammarinese Socialist Party politicians
Secretaries of State for Labor of San Marino
Secretaries of State for Sports of San Marino
Secretaries of State for Tourism of San Marino